Hunted is a British reality series that began airing on Channel 4 on 10 September 2015. The series features contestants who are instructed to go on the run for a period of 25 (originally 28) days in mainland Great Britain, whilst avoiding a team of Hunters composed of former and serving police, intelligence personnel, and on-foot teams. During their time, the Hunters have access to contestants' personal information and use "powers of the state" such as ANPR, CCTV and call tracing to locate contestants. At times, the Hunters will use social media and monetary rewards to members of the public (and captured contestants) for information leading to a successful capture. On the final day, any remaining contestants must reach a designated "extraction" point before being captured, winning a share of £100,000. It has a similar format to the programme Wanted which aired from 1996–1997 on Channel 4.

A celebrity adaptation, Celebrity Hunted, is also produced in aid of Stand Up To Cancer, where contestants compete for a shorter time period of 14 days.

Format and rules

In both the civilian and celebrity series, the contestants, now regarded as Fugitives, voluntarily go on the run in mainland Great Britain and must avoid detection from the Hunters, a group of current and former police and intelligence officials for 25 days (28 in the first two series and 14 for the celebrity series). From series two, the contestants are escorted to a public area and given a head start before the Hunters begin their search and are given the names of their targets. Fugitives are given a debit card with a small amount of money provided by the production team, and a rucksack containing essential and personal items (though in series five, the fugitives began with only the clothes on their back and no head start). During their time on the run the Fugitives can use any existing connections, or ask members of the general public, to assist them in avoiding capture.

Whilst the Fugitives attempt to avoid using technology and thus detection, the Hunters use a vast array of different "powers of the state", such as closed circuit surveillance, phone records and number plate recognition to pinpoint their chosen target. If one (or more) Fugitives have become difficult to locate, the Hunters use social media to encourage members of the public to reveal any information, and post content specifically for a Fugitive to reveal their location without realising. Hunters may also be directly contacted by the public with any leads by telephone. Any member of the public with information leading to capture is compensated for their effort. Hunters additionally operate throughout the country through use of two-person ground teams that can deploy immediately under order of the Chief. The ground teams also perform reconnaissance at Fugitives' homes and attempt to goad family members or loved ones for information and/or may be observed to determine any irregularities in their daily routines.

When a Fugitive is caught, they are told their time on the run is over and are escorted to a vehicle for debrief back at the Hunters’ headquarters.

In the final few days of the game, any Fugitives still on the run are given instructions for their 'extraction point' and a finite amount of time to get there. The Hunters are told of the last-known locations of the Fugitives and extend their efforts to figure out where the extraction is taking place. When a Fugitive successfully reaches the extraction point within the time-frame, they can no longer be caught by the Hunters and are deemed a Winner. Due to the nature of the show, there are two possible outcomes to the hunt: one or more Fugitives can reach the extraction point and win, or every Fugitive can be caught and the hunt prematurely ends (known as a "clean sweep").

Regular series

Series 1 (2015)
Fourteen contestants were chosen and began in their respective hometowns. Fairoaks Airport in Surrey served as the extraction point.

Notes

Before he was caught, Ricky Allen proved so elusive while on the run in Scotland that one of the Hunters described it as "a real-life 39 steps" which was published in a newspaper as well as "wanted" posters.

Series 2 (2016)
Ten contestants were chosen and began in Milk Street in Birmingham. The Isle of Sheppey in Kent served as the extraction point.  This was the first series where there was prize money for winners.

Notes

After Alikor was caught, he was taken to Hunter HQ where Chief Peter Bleksley offered him £1,000 for information of the whereabouts of Adesina. Alike declined the offer but admitted that he would have helped the Hunters if they had offered him £50,000.

Series 3 (2018)
Nine contestants were chosen and began in Manchester city centre. The River Dart in Devon served as the extraction point. From this series onwards, the number of days to avoid capture was reduced to 25.

Notes

Crowe was caught on the first day of being on the run.

Father and son fugitives Bob and Alex Ayling began as a duo, but at Bob's encouragement about mid-way through their time on the run, they agreed to separate and reunite on the day of extraction. Alex had Asperger syndrome and was bullied at school, but wanted to prove himself.

Murphy and Appleton evaded the Hunters by cycling from place to place as their mode of transport.

After the Fugitives learned the location of the extraction point, Alex Ayling was seen by the Hunters on CCTV appearing to drop something into a drain. The Hunters spent a considerable amount of time searching the drain for the item, which turned out only to be a receipt.

Series 4 (2019)
Ten contestants were chosen and began at the Port of Liverpool. The Bullring Shopping Centre in Birmingham served as the extraction point. This was the first time in any series that the Hunters won.

Series 5 (2020)
Ten contestants were chosen and began at A Bond Warehouse on Spike Island, Bristol. For this series, the Fugitives started with no supplies or prior knowledge of their starting point. Amlwch Port in Anglesey served as the extraction point.

Series 6 (2022)
Eleven contestants were chosen and began on the Isle of Wight. For this series, the fugitives started with only a change of clothes and a small amount of money. The island of Inchmurrin in Loch Lomond served as the extraction point.

Hunters
A team of 30 specialists includes former and serving police and intelligence personnel, an ex CIA agent and cyber intelligence experts, who use the Fugitives' online footprints to research and hunt them. The team has access to replicated powers of the state, including CCTV and ANPR. Before starting, all the Fugitives gave permission to be tracked in the same way as the state might track a fugitive – their cash cards and phones are monitored, their houses searched and their friends and family questioned. The Hunters also use media campaigns to recruit the general public into helping them, offering financial incentives. The team is split into two parts: (i) a team of operatives in the field who are in vehicles across the UK, on standby to follow orders from Hunted HQ to head to a particular location to follow up leads on Fugitives' whereabouts or to question their friends and family; and (ii) a team in the Hunted HQ to gather Intelligence, which they then distribute to field teams.

List of chiefs

Celebrity Hunted
A celebrity series was confirmed by Channel 4 in 2017 with their appearance fees donated to Stand up To Cancer. The rules for the celebrity edition remained the same as the Hunted series, but the celebrities are given fourteen days to evade capture.

There have so far been four series of the celebrity series, with a fifth being filmed in summer 2022.

Series 1 (2017)
Seven celebrities were chosen and began at Somerset House in London. Orford Ness served as the extraction point.

Series 2 (2018)
Eight celebrities were chosen and began at the Tower of London. Fawley Power Station served as the extraction point.

Series 3 (2019)
Eight celebrities were chosen and began at Ham Polo Club in Richmond. In this series, the celebrities started with tracking devices attached to their ankles. Herstmonceux Castle served as the extraction point.

Series 4 (2022)
Eight celebrities were chosen and began at the London Eye. The Extraction Point for this series was Formby Beach.

Series 5 (2023)

Production
Each Fugitive is filmed by a dedicated cameraman, who follows them throughout their time on the run. While filming, the production team is split in two so that the team working with the Hunters are separate from the team working with the Fugitives, to provide a more realistic experience and prevent information leaking between them. Freedom of Information requests are submitted by the Hunters to find the location of state-owned CCTV cameras positioned throughout the British mainland. When real footage could not be obtained, producers' cameras capture footage that would have been available to the state, which is stored on a central database for the Hunters to access if requested. 

The Hunters are overseen by Kevin O’Leary, an independent adjudicator and former Head of Covert Operations for the Metropolitan Police who does not appear on the show. O'Leary's role as an adjudicator is to make sure that the information requested and gathered by the Hunters reflected the information that would be available to them in real life and within the appropriate time frame. O'Leary is the only person who has the power to release information to the Hunters and would only do so when considered that the Hunters have completed sufficient detective work to justify access to the information.

Ratings
Episode ratings are taken from BARB and include Channel 4 +1.

Hunted

Series 1 (2015)

Series 2 (2016)

Series 3 (2018)

Series 4 (2019)

Series 5 (2020)

Series 6 (2022)

Celebrity Hunted

Series 1 (2017)

Series 2 (2018)

Series 3 (2019)

Critical reception
The Telegraph review complimented the series, saying the "game show element was very effective, playing with our instinctive tendency to take the side of the pursued, and skilfully edited to keep the tension high". The Daily Mirror Adam Postan described the series as "the biggest TV joke of the year", pointing out that most of the surveillance powers were replicated by methods that were unexplained.

International versions 

In the United States, the show is produced by Endemol Shine North America under the same title Hunted, which premiered on 22 January 2017 on CBS.

In Spain, the show is produced by Movistar+ in collaboration with Shine Iberia under the title La huida ("The Escape"), which premiered on 8 April 2016 on #0.

In Denmark, the show is produced by Metronome Productions A/S under the title Menneskejagt ("Manhunt"), which premiered on 24 August 2016 on DR3. In 2021 the show was revived by discovery+ and renamed to Jaget vildt ("Hunted wild), which premiered on 7 January 2021 on discovery+.

In Russia, the show is produced by WeiT Media under the title Охота ("The Hunt"), which premiered on 17 September 2016 on free-to-air network NTV.

In the Netherlands, the show is produced by Simpel Media commissioned by AVROTROS under the same title Hunted, which premiered on 17 October 2016 on NPO3. In early 2021 Hunted VIPS, in which Dutch celebrities are hunted premiered. In early 2022 Hunted: Into The Wild premiered, in which participants are hunted in the wilds of another European country.

In France, the show is produced by Endemol Shine Group and commissioned by RMC Découverte under the title Escape, 21 jours pour disparaître ("Escape, 21 days to disappear"),which is set to premiere in 2018. In 2021, the French version of Celebrity Hunted was an Amazon Original, first available.

In Italy, Celebrity Hunted is the first non-fiction Italian product of Amazon Prime Video, which commissioned it to Endemol Shine Group. Production started in 2019, and the first season was released in 2020. A second season was released in 2021.

The German version of Celebrity Hunted was also an Amazon Original, first available in 2021. At the end, viewers were invited to sign up for a series. 

An Australian version under the same title Hunted, was commissioned in 2021 for Network 10, began casting in July 2021 and premiered on 17 July 2022 after filming in early 2022, with former British chief hunter Ben Owens as Deputy Intelligence.

Legend:
 Currently airing franchise
 Franchise with an upcoming season
 Franchise no longer airing
 Status unknown

Notes

References

External links 
 
 

2015 British television series debuts
2010s British reality television series
2020s British reality television series
Channel 4 reality television shows
English-language television shows
Television series by Banijay